The Kinks Greatest Hits! (also spelled The Kinks' Greatest Hits!) is a compilation album by the English rock band the Kinks. Released in the United States in August 1966 by Reprise Records, the album mostly consists of singles issued by the group between 1964 and 1966. The band's first greatest hits album, it remained on the Billboard Top LPs chart for over a year, peaking at number 9, making it the Kinks' highest charting album in the US. The album was in print for decades and was the Kinks' only gold record in America until 1980.

Release 

Reprise Records released The Kinks Greatest Hits! in the US on 10 August 1966. The band's first greatest hits album, it mostly consists of singles issued by the group between 1964 and 1966, ranging from "You Really Got Me" to  "Dedicated Follower of Fashion", recorded in mid-July1964 and February1966, respectively. All the tracks were recorded at Pye or IBC Studios in London and were produced by Shel Talmy. "Something Better Beginning" is the only non-single on the album, first issued on Kinda Kinks (1965).

The album's liner notes include one of the earliest instances of Ray Davies, the Kinks' principal songwriter, being characterised as a genius. Author Thomas. M. Kitts suggests the description of Davies as "a brooding-faced, long-haired genius" was an attempt to connect him to the English poet Lord Byron. Eder writes that Ed Thrasher's cover art for the album, depicting the band in several concert photographs, further added to its collectibility.

Commercial performance and reception 

Like subsequent British compilations collecting the Kinks' mid-1960s hits, the album's sales surpassed those of the band's late 1960s studio albums. It remained on the Billboard Top LPs chart for 64 weeks, peaking in November 1966 at number 9, making it the Kinks' highest charting album in the US. It additionally reached number 13 and 8 on Cash Box and Record World charts, respectively. RIAA certified it gold in November1968, indicating retail sales of US$1million (equivalent to US$ million in ).  The album remained in print for around 20 years and was the Kinks' only American gold record until Low Budget (1979) certification in 1980.

Crawdaddy magazine critic Sandy Pearlman contemporaneously described it as among the best greatest hits albums available. Authors Steve Alleman and Bruce Eder each retrospectively write that the album's joining of various styles served to indicate the Kinks' earliest musical developments, though Eder suggests the album's shortcoming is its omission of the band's later 1966 songs, like "Sunny Afternoon" and "Dandy". Critic Robert Christgau included the album in his "Basic Record Library" of 1950s and 1960s recordings, published in his book Christgau's Record Guide: Rock Albums of the Seventies (1981).

Track listing
All songs by Ray Davies.

Side one
 "You Really Got Me" – 2:20
 "Tired of Waiting for You" – 2:30
 "Set Me Free" – 2:10
 "Something Better Beginning" – 2:23
 "Who'll Be the Next in Line" – 1:59

Side two
 "Till the End of the Day" – 2:20
 "Dedicated Follower of Fashion" – 2:59
 "A Well Respected Man" – 2:38
 "Ev'rybody's Gonna Be Happy" – 2:15
 "All Day and All of the Night" – 2:20

Personnel 

According to band researcher Doug Hinman, except where noted:

The Kinks
Ray Davies lead vocals; electric and acoustic rhythm guitars; piano 
Dave Davies backing vocals, electric lead guitar
Pete Quaife backing vocals, bass
Mick Avory drums; tambourine 

Additional musicians
Clem Cattini drums 
Rasa Davies backing vocals 
Perry Ford piano 
Bobby Graham drums 
Arthur Greenslade piano 
Nicky Hopkins piano 
Unidentified girlfriends of the Kinks backing vocals 
Unidentified session musician rhythm guitar 

Production and additional personnel
Bob Auger engineering
Glyn Johns engineering 
Alan MacKenzie engineering 
Shel Talmy producer
Ed Thrasher art direction

Charts and certifications

Notes

References

Citations

Sources

External links 
 

The Kinks compilation albums
1966 greatest hits albums
Reprise Records compilation albums